Peter Yang Kwan, also known as Yang Qun (25 September 1935 – 24 October 2022) was a Hong Kong martial artist film actor, film producer and director, best known for his appearances in Hong Kong action cinema of the 1970s and 1980s.

Yang starred in the 1969 film King of Kings.

Biography
Yang was born in 1935 in Harbin, Manchuria. He left Harbin at the age of 6 and went to Beijing and studied in Yu Ying Secondary School until the age of 12. He then moved to Shanghai with his family because of the Chinese Civil War for 8 months. The family finally sought refuge in Taiwan after their brief stay in Shanghai.

In Taiwan, he studied in a practical Mandarin School for a year in Taipei before again relocating with his family in Hong Kong and studied in the Yin Nan Middle School.

During these years, his family's financial status plummeted significantly. In order to help with his family's situation, Yang took up odd jobs. He was cast in a few films as an extra and did this for several years. He also worked in radio stations and dubbed for Japanese films in Mandarin. He also worked as an auxiliary police officer in Hong Kong.

Yang maintained his multifaceted life until 1960 when he landed a role as a leading actor in "Qin Xiang Lian".

Filmography

Films 
 1957 Our Sister Hedy - David 
 1957 Mambo Girl - Student
 1957 Golden Lotus - Hsiao Li
 1958 Scarlet Doll - Hua Ji Yu
 1958 Jade-Green Lake
The Witch-Girl, He Yueer 1961
Mung Li Chuen 1963
The Adulteress (1963 film)
The Story Of Qin Xianglian 1964
Dodder Flower 1965
Commander Underground 1967
The Knight Of Old Cathay 1968
Greatest Fight 1968
Superior Darter 1969
Son Of Swordsman 1969
King of Kings (1969 film)
You, Me And Him 1970 Actor
Way Ching Killer The Dragon 1970 Actor
The Lost Spring 1970 Actor
From The Highway 1970 Actor
Four Moods 1970 Actor
Dusk (1970 film) Actor
You Can't Tell Him 1971 Actor
The Tsu Hong Wu 1971 Actor
Legends Of Cheating 1971 
The Ammunition Hunters 1971 Actor
The Escape (1972 film) Actor, Director, Presenter
The Avenger (1972 film) Actor
Tales Of Larceny 1973 Actor
Morning Goodbye 1973 Actor
Illicit Desire 1973 Actor
Cheat To Cheat 1973 Actor
Lady Blood Boxer 1974 Actor
The Golden Lotus 1974 Actor
Blood Reincarnation 1974 Actor
My Wacky, Wacky World 1975 Actor (cameo)
Confession Of A Concubine 1975 Actor
I Want More (film) 1976 Actor, Director
800 Heroes (film) 1976 (film about the defense of Sihang Warehouse) Actor
Old Soldiers Never Die 1978 Actor, Director, Producer
Enter The Fat Dragon 1978 Actor, Planning
The Battle of Ku-ning-tou 1979 Actor
 The Shell Game (1980) Actor
 Encore (1980 film) Actor
 Man On The Brink (1981) Producer
 The Gambler's Duel (1981) Actor
 Big Boss (1981 film) (also known as Ding ye) Actor
 Lily Under The Gun (1982) Actor
 First Time (1983) Actor, Manager, Producer
 Twinkle, Twinkle Lucky Stars (1985)
 The Protector (1985) Actor
 Cop Of The Town (1985) Producer
 Cop Busters (1985) Actor
 Parking Service (1986) Actor
 Angel (1987) Actor
 Tragic Hero (1987) Actor
 Sworn Brothers (1987) Actor
 Rich And Famous (1987) Actor
 Border Line Story (1988) Actor
Point Of No Return (1990 film) Actor
Never Say Regret 1990 Actor
My Hero (1990 film) Actor
The Plot (film) 1991 Actor
The Godfather's Daughter Mafia Blues 1991 Actor
Fantasy Romance 1991 Producer
Gambling Soul 1992 Actor
Beauty Investigator 1992 Actor
Run For Life - Ladies From China 1993 Actor
Possessed (1994 film) Actor
Life Is A Miracle 2001 Actor

Personal life
Yang was married to Florence Fung-Chi. They had a son and a daughter.

References

External links 
Peter Yang Kwan at hkcinemamagic.com
 

1935 births
2022 deaths
Hong Kong male film actors
Hong Kong film producers
Hong Kong male television actors
Male actors from Harbin
Male actors from Heilongjiang
Chinese Civil War refugees
Chinese male film actors
Chinese male television actors
20th-century Chinese male actors
20th-century Hong Kong male actors